RS5 may refer to:

 Audi RS5, a 2010–present German compact executive performance car
 Audi RS5 DTM, a 2013–2018 German race car
 Audi RS5 Turbo DTM, a 2019–present German race car
 Baojun RS-5, a 2018–present Chinese compact SUV